Tengella is a genus of false wolf spiders that was first described by Friedrich Dahl in 1901. It is a senior synonym of Metafecenia.

Species
 it contains five species, found in Panama, Honduras, Nicaragua, and Mexico:
Tengella albolineata (F. O. Pickard-Cambridge, 1902) – Mexico
Tengella kalebi Candia-Ramírez & Valdez-Mondragón, 2014 – Mexico
Tengella perfuga Dahl, 1901 – Nicaragua
Tengella radiata (Kulczyński, 1909) – Honduras to Panama
Tengella thaleri Platnick, 2009 – Mexico

References

Further reading
 
 
 

Zoropsidae
Araneomorphae genera
Spiders of Mexico
Spiders of Central America
Taxa named by Friedrich Dahl